The Thai rank of Field Marshal  is the most senior rank of the Royal Thai Army. Today it is ceremonially held by members of the Thai royal family and exists only on paper in the Thai military. It has not been awarded to a regular commissioned officer since 1973. The Royal Thai Navy equivalent is known as Chom Phon Ruea ('Admiral of the Fleet') and Chom Phon Akat ('Marshal of the Royal Thai Air Force') for the Royal Thai Air Force.

The King of Thailand, as head of the armed forces, is automatically made a Chom Phon upon accession. The rank was formally created in 1888, together with all other ranks of the military by King Chulalongkorn (Rama V), who wanted to modernize his armed forces along Western lines. Apart from the monarchs, there have been 13 appointments to this rank.

Supreme Head of the Army

List of field marshals

See also

Military ranks of the Thai armed forces
Admiral of the Fleet (Thailand) (Chom Phon Ruea): equivalent rank in the Royal Thai Navy
Marshal of the Royal Thai Air Force (Chom Phon Akat): equivalent rank in the Royal Thai Air Force
Field marshal
List of field marshals
Head of the Royal Thai Armed Forces

References

Chom phon
Thailand